Stephen Marsh (born 2 June 1947) is a British luger. He competed in the men's doubles event at the 1972 Winter Olympics.

References

1947 births
Living people
British male lugers
Olympic lugers of Great Britain
Lugers at the 1972 Winter Olympics
Place of birth missing (living people)